Zannatul Ferdaus Misty known by the name Misty Jannat is a Bangladeshi actress and model. She also appeared television dramas and advertisement as well.

Early life and background
Misty Jannat was born in Khulna, Bangladesh. She studied up to HSC level in Khulna then moved to Dhaka for the studies and also focuses acting. She studied dental medicine at Safena Medical & Dental College. Currently She is Dental Surgeon at Mandy Dental College. Her father is a teacher and mother is a social worker.

Career
In 2014, Jannat made her acting debut in the film Love Station, where her co-actor was Bappy Chowdhury. Then she appeared in the movie Chini Bibi with co-actor Joy Chowdhury. She is also appeared in the movie Amar Prem Tumi with tollywood actor Soham Chakraborty. She also debut South Indian movie Rangbaz Khilari, with Rakesh. Recently, She busy with two new films just like Ami Neta Hobo and Mamla Hamla Jhamela. The films will be produced under the banner of Shapla Media company, while both projects will be directed by Uttam Akash.

Filmography

TV appearance
 Din Ratrir Manush
 Accident
 Jabbar Alir Dinkal
 Bristy Thamar Por
 Bheja Megher Shopnogulo

Advertisement
 Suresh Sarishar Tel

References

External links
 

Living people
People from Khulna
People from Khulna District
Bengali television actresses
Bangladeshi film actresses
Bangladeshi female models
Year of birth missing (living people)